Mont. may refer to:
Camille Montagne, French botanist, mycologist and military physician
Montana, a U.S. state

See also
Mont (disambiguation)
Montenegro, a country in Southeastern Europe